The School of Air Power Studies is the premier training institution of the Namibian Air Force.

History
At the onset of the formation of the Namibian Defence Force Air Wing there was no capacity to train  Pilots and maintenance technicians. An agreement with the Namibian Aviation Training Academy was forged. The academy was responsible for providing flight training  to aspirant and maintenance training to  aspirant technicians. President Hifikepunye Pohamba Inaugurated the School on 13 February 2015. The school was set up in stages the first phase was the Aircraft Technical Training Centre.

Location
The school is located at the Grootfontein Air Force Base. For vocational training the initial phase is carried out at Eros Airport in Windhoek.

Training
The school is set up in three Wings.

Flight Training Centre
The flight training centre is responsible for training flight personnel for the Air Force.

Leadership and Academic Training Wing
The school of air power studies offers the three month potential Junior Non Commissioned Officers (NCO) Course, Train the Trainer (Instructor) Course as well as Basic  to Advance HR courses.

Technical Training Center
Located at the Grootfontein AFB the Centre provide vocational training to technicians. It has electrical / electronic laboratories, aircraft systems simulators to train on training on fixed wing aircraft and helicopters for training. The centre caters for technical training of the Air force's ground personnel. Students from SADC Air Forces have also been accepted to institution'. Its curriculum are run in conjunction with the Namibian Aviation Training Academy. Qualifications offered include certificates and three year diplomas in:
Armament, Ground Support Equipment and Ejection Seat Trade
Aircraft Maintenance, Technician-Electric and Instrument Avionics Trade
Aircraft Maintenance Technician Airframe and Power-Plant trade

Maintenance training is carried out in three phases, phase one(vocational training) is done over 35 weeks in Windhoek, phase two (professional training) is carried out  for 60 weeks in Grootfontein and phase three (test trade preparation) is done for 7 weeks at Grootfotein Technical Training Centre.

References

Military of Namibia